Acentrophorus is an extinct genus of prehistoric ray-finned fish from the Permian and Triassic periods. Fossils have been found in Australia, Germany and the United Kingdom. It was the oldest known neopterygian.

See also

 Prehistoric fish
 List of prehistoric bony fish

References

Notes 

Semionotiformes
Fossils of Germany
Kupferschiefer
Permian fish of Europe
Triassic fish of Australia